The Calamba City Hall (Filipino: Gusaling Panlungsod ng Calamba), officially the City Hall of Calamba is located in the plaza of Calamba, Laguna in the Philippines. It is where the mayor of the city holds office and the chambers in the Calamba City Council., The old Calamba City Hall was located near the St. John the Baptist Parish Church and the Calamba Claypot.

Etymology
The Calamba City Hall, built in 2009, is made from Octagon-pine which holds the front and the back of the city hall. The Calamba City Council decided to design the new hall into an octagon shape, believed to be a unique city hall in the Philippines in the 21st century, which represents Calamba City as the new Regional Center of Region 4-A Calabarzon in the year 2003, followed by Lucena City in Quezon.

See also 
 Calamba Church
 Calamba Claypot
 Rizal Shrine

References 

Buildings and structures in Calamba, Laguna
City and municipal halls in the Philippines
Neoclassical architecture in the Philippines
Government buildings completed in 2010
21st-century architecture in the Philippines